Beau Rivage means "Beautiful shore" in French. It is the name of several hotels and resorts, including:

Beau Rivage (Beirut)
Beau Rivage (Geneva)
Beau Rivage (Mississippi)
Beau-Rivage Palace in Lausanne
Beau Rivage Island (Parks Canada) in Thousand Islands, Ontario, Canada

 Beau Rivage, the name of the second turn at the Circuit de Monaco, home of the Monaco Grand Prix